The 2022-23 season is the sixth season in Jamshedpur FC's existence, and their fifth season in the Indian Super League. This season of the ISL witnesses the return of the home-away format of the matches similar to that of the 2019–20 Indian Super League season after a break of two years due to the COVID-19 pandemic in the country.

Background 

After a great record-breaking season of 2021-22 on 22 March 2022 club officially announced that Head Coach, Owen Coyle won’t be continuing his journey at Jamshedpur. The club released an official statement stating 
Jamshedpur FC Head Coach, Owen Coyle officially announced today that he won’t be continuing his journey in India in the next season of Hero Indian Super League. The Scotsman had a successful two years with the club which he continuously kept on improving with his smart signings, promotion of young players and amazing man-management skills. He lifted the Jamshedpur side to 6th place in 2020-21, just 4 points shy off the top-4 places and later in 2021-22 propelled them to the top of the table with a historic Hero ISL League Shield Winners’ campaign where his team smashed and steamrolled upon records. 

On 10 July 2022, Aidy Boothroyd was appointed as head coach of Jamshedpur. He said: Jamshedpur FC are the Champions of India currently and the city has a tremendous football legacy. We want to continue this upward trajectory and make the club reach places and win honours that our fans are dreaming of. We want to take the club to the next level and to compete really with the top teams of Asia. 

On 14 July 2022 Jamshedpur FC confirm the extension of Leslie Cleevely as Goalkeeping Coach of the club. The world-famous Goalkeeping Coach, fondly called ‘Les’, has signed upto May 2023 and will join Aidy Boothroyd’s coaching staff. When asked about his thoughts on extending his stay at Jamshedpur after a successful season, Leslie happily stated, When I received the offer to come back as goalkeeping coach and defend our Hero ISL league title, it didn’t take any persuasion. I’m looking forward to getting to work with our exciting roster of goalkeepers and of course Aidy Boothroyd who is a fantastic coach and the right man for the job. 

On 16 July 2022 club appoints Stuart Watkiss as Assistant Coach. Upon signing for the ISL League Shield winners Stuart opined his ambition with JFC, It's a big job at Jamshedpur FC, the defending Champions of India. I come with the aim to help the club win back-to-back league titles and also help bring more honours. Along with a top Head Coach like Aidy Boothroyd, the club aims for the maximum and we will take it one game at a time. Looking forward to it. 

Narender Gahlot, Mobashir Rahman, Greg Stewart and Jordan Murray leaves club after the season.

December 
On 6 December, Wellington Priori's contract was terminated by mutual agreement with immediate effect. The Brazilian returned to the Red Miners set-up ahead of the start of the 2022–23 campaign and played in six matches for the club.

On 7 December, the Red Miners completed the signing of Rafael Crivellaro, till the end of the season.

On 26 December, the Red Miners announced the departure of midifelder SK Sahil to Mohammedan, on loan till the end of the season.

On 30 December, the Red Miners announced the signing of Australian defender Dylan Fox, till the end of the season after captain Peter Hartley parted ways by mutual consent.

January 
On 7 January, the Men of Steel announced the signing of Pronay Halder, on a contract till May 2024.

Players

Current squad

Pre-season and friendlies

Competitions

Overview

Durand Cup 

Jamshedpur were drawn in the Group A for the 131st edition of the Durand Cup along with two other ISL sides.

Group stage

Matches

Indian Super League 
This season of the Indian Super League will be played across the country in home and away formats after two seasons of hosting it in Goa due to the COVID-19 pandemic.

League table

League Results by Round

Matches 
Note: Indian Super League announced the fixtures for the 2022–23 season on 1 September 2022 with the fixture between the Blasters and East Bengal on 7 October serving as the opening match of the season.

Qualifier for the 2023–24 AFC Champions League group stage slot 

The winners of the Indian Super League Shield 2021–22 (Jamshedpur FC) and winners of the same in the 2022–23 season (Mumbai City FC) will fight it out in a one-off match on April 4, 2023. The match will be played between the matches of the Super Cup.

The winners of the game will get a direct slot in the 2023–24 AFC Champions League group stage.

Super Cup 

Jamshedpur were drawn in the Group C for the 3rd edition of the Super Cup along with two other ISL sides.

Group stage

Matches

Statistics 
All stats are correct as of 22 February 2023

Squad appearances and goals 
Note: Jamshedpur fielded their reserve side as their first team for the Durand Cup. As a result, the lists below include the stats of players who featured for the club in different sections of the ISL and the Durand Cup.

Indian Super League 

|-
!colspan=16 style="background:#ED2939; color:#000080;"| Goalkeepers

|-
!colspan=16 style="background:#000080; color:#ED2939;"| Defenders

|-
!colspan=16 style="background:#ED2939; color:#000080;"| Midfielders

|-
!colspan=16 style="background:#000080; color:#ED2939;"| Forwards

|}

Durand Cup 

|-
!colspan=16 style="background:#ED2939; color:#000080;"| Goalkeepers

|-
!colspan=16 style="background:#000080; color:#ED2939;"| Defenders

|-
!colspan=16 style="background:#ED2939; color:#000080;"| Midfielders

|-
!colspan=16 style="background:#000080; color:#ED2939;"| Forwards

|}

Clean-sheets

References 

2022–23 Indian Super League season by team
Jamshedpur FC seasons